A cheese dog is a hot dog served with cheese or processed cheese on it or stuffed within it, as a filling.

Cheese types

In the United States, sliced or grated cheese, such as cheddar or American cheese, is commonly used, often served melted on the hot dogs. The use of other types of cheese also occurs, such as cream cheese and Swiss cheese. The cheese may be on the bun, on the wiener, processed inside the hot dog, or placed in the middle of a hot dog that has been sliced in half.

Bread types
Traditional hot dog buns are typically used. Slices of toast are also used sometimes, or just plain bread.

Variations

Coney dog

Cheeses are also often served on chili dogs or Coney Island hot dogs. An example includes the Cincinnati Cheese Coney which uses shredded cheddar cheese.

Francheezie

In Chicago there is a variation of the danger dog called the Francheezie.  Typically found at "greasy spoon" restaurants, it consists of a jumbo hot dog split in the middle and filled with Cheddar cheese (or Velveeta). It is wrapped in bacon and deep-fried, then served on a toasted bun.

Macaroni and cheese dog
Another variation is a hot dog topped with macaroni and cheese.

Reuben dog
A reuben dog can consist of a hot dog topped with ingredient combinations such as corned beef, sauerkraut, Swiss cheese and Russian dressing.

Seattle dog
A Seattle-style hot dog, sometimes referred to as a "Seattle Dog," is a hot dog topped with cream cheese that has become popular in Seattle, Washington.

Swiss-style cheese dogs
A Swiss schnauzer is a regional variation consisting of a bratwurst served with Swiss cheese and sauerkraut. In San Diego, California, a Swiss-style hot dog called a "Swiener" is prepared with a hot dog and Raclette cheese stuffed inside of hollowed-out baguette bread.

Texas Tommy
A Texas Tommy is prepared with bacon and cheese.

The Beach Dog 

The "McGrath Beach Dog" claimed to be the first of its kind is prepared when the hot dog is split down the middle and American cheese slices are placed inside the dog and allowed to melt before serving.

See also

 Finger food
 List of hot dogs
 List of cheese dishes
 List of sausage dishes

References

Further reading

 
 
 
 
 
 
 Mercuri, Becky (2007). The Great American Hot Dog Book. Gibbs Smith.  Accessed August 3, 2012.

External links
 
 Cheese dogs at Google images

American cuisine
Cheese dishes
Hot dogs
Sausage dishes
Macaroni dishes